John L Sayers (d. 14 September 2021) was a New Zealand-born  Australian recording engineer, producer and studio designer who engineered and/or produced many classic Australian rock and pop albums and singles from 1969 to the present. Sayers is one of a number of producer-engineers who are associated with the Melbourne popular music scene of the 1960s and 1970s and in particular with the renowned Armstrong's Studios, the venue where many of the most successful Australian pop/rock recordings of the period were recorded. He created the leading studio acoustics Forum Recording Studio Design, and designed Enmore Audio in Sydney.

Recording credits
Sayers' recording credits as either engineer or producer or both include:

1960s

 Liv Maessen - "Snowbird", "Knock Knock Who's There?"
 Matt Flinders - "Picking up Pebbles", "Butterfly"
 John Farnham - "One"
 Max Merritt and the Meteors - Western Union Man album :
 John Williamson - "Old Man Emu"
 Russell Morris - "The Real Thing", "Part Three into Paper Walls", "The Girl That I Love", "Sweet, Sweet Love", Bloodstone (album)
 The Masters Apprentices - "Turn up Your Radio", "5:10 Man"
 Ross D. Wyllie - "The Star", "Funny Man"
 Lionel Rose - "I Thank You".
 The Group - "Such a Lovely Way".
 Axiom - "Arkansas Grass", "A Little Ray of Sunshine".
 Robin Jolley - "Marshall's Portable Music Machine".
 Ronnie Burns - "Smiley"
 Spectrum - "I'll Be Gone", Milesago album
 Indelible Murtcepts - Warts up your Nose (Album)
 Ted Mulry - "Julia"
 Zoot - Just Zoot (Album), "Strange Things", "1 x 2 x 3 x 4"
 Fraternity - "Seasons of Change"
 The Valentines - "Nick Nack Paddy Wack"

1970s

 Brian Cadd - Gingerman (album)
 Ted Mulry - Marcia
 Chain - Towards the Blues album
 Chain - "Grab A Snatch & Hold It"
 Chain - Judgement
 John Farnham Sings the Shows, Together (with Alison Durbin)
 Matt Taylor - Straight as a Die (Album) - I Remember when I was Young
 Wendy Saddington - Looking Through a Window
 Rick Springfield - Speak to the Sky
 Kerry Biddell - You've got a Friend (Album)
 Max Merritt And The Meteors - Stray Cats (Album)
 Billy Thorpe/Warren Morgan - Thumping Pig And Puffing Billy (Album)
 Lobby Lloyd and the Coloured Balls - Ball Power (Album)
 McKenzie Theory - Out of the Blue (Album)
 Jimmy Little - Baby Blue
 Ted Mulry Gang - Jump in my Car (Album), My Little Girl, Dark Town Strutters Ball
 Jackie Orszaczky - Morning in Beramiada (Album)
 Sherbet - Life (Album) - Child's Play
 Hush - Boney Moroney, Glad all Over
 Jon English and Renee Geyer - Every Beat Of My Heart
 Marcia Hines - Marcia Shines (Album) - Fire and Rain/You, From The Inside (Album).
 Chariot - (Album)
 Southern Cross - Southern Cross (Album)
 Pantha - Dway Do Dway Do (Album)
 Greg Quill - The Outlaws Reply (Album)
 Benjamin Hugg - What's Been Happening (Album)
 Jeff St John - So Far So Good (Album)
 Australia - Maiden Australia (Album)
 Ray Burton - Dreamers and Nightflyers (Album)
 Coolangatta Gold - Film Soundtrack.
 Radio Birdman - Burn My Eye (EP)
 Radio Birdman - Radios Appear (Album)
 Mi-Sex - Space Race (Album)
 Mark Gillespie - Only Human (Album)

1980s

 Australian Crawl - Phalanx - Live Album
 Goanna - Oceania (Album) - Common Ground
 DD Smash - The Optimist
 The Motivators - The Motivators (Album)
 Jim Keays - "Lucifer Street" - Red on the Meter (Album)
 Mark Gillespie - Sweet Nothing (Album)
 Mondo Rock - "Come Said the Boy" - The Modern Bop (Album)
 Mi-sex - Shanghaied! (Album) - Falling In And Out, Shanghaied

1990s

 Troy Cassar Daley - Beyond The Dancing (ARIA winner)
 Cam Fletcher - Kickin Up Dirt
 Jimmy Little - Yorta Yorta Man
 Jade Hurley - Life - Wouldn't Be Dead For Quids
 Tracey Fogarty - Playing to Win
 Kerry McInerney - Fools Game
 Spot The Dog - Drunk On The Moon
 Olivia Newton-John - Ghia
 The Spencer Band - This is Now
 Rough Red - Living in Australia

2000s

 Kerry Leigh & Expresso Lane
 Dave Cavanagh & Cavo

References

External links 
 

Year of birth missing
Australian audio engineers
Australian record producers